The eighth season of Saturday Night Live, an American sketch comedy series, originally aired in the United States on NBC between September 25, 1982, and May 14, 1983.

Format changes
Dick Ebersol brought back the show's cold openings that ended with "Live from New York, it's Saturday Night!" and the monologues by the hosts. Ebersol also changed Weekend Update's name for the second time, to Saturday Night News. Since Brian Doyle-Murray and Christine Ebersole had both been dropped, a new anchor was needed for the segment. Brad Hall got the gig and became the new anchor.

Notable moments
Notable moments of this season included Drew Barrymore hosting the show—the youngest ever person to host. During the episode, the audience at home was given the chance to vote on whether or not Andy Kaufman should be banned from the show. The vote was conducted by a 1-900 number. At the end of the show, Kaufman was banned from ever performing on SNL again.

Another notable moment was when Eddie Murphy hosted the show. Murphy substituted for his 48 Hours co-star Nick Nolte. Murphy became the only person to have hosted the show while still a cast member. He announced "Live from New York, it's the Eddie Murphy Show!"

Cast
Before the start of the season. Brian Doyle-Murray, Christine Ebersole and Tony Rosato were dropped and replaced by Brad Hall, Gary Kroeger and Julia Louis-Dreyfus.

Cast roster
Repertory players
Robin Duke
Mary Gross
Brad Hall
Tim Kazurinsky
Gary Kroeger
Julia Louis-Dreyfus
Eddie Murphy
Joe Piscopo
bold denotes Weekend Update anchor

Writers

Before the season, Paul Barrosse was added as a writer.

This season's writers were Paul Barrosse, Barry W. Blaustein, Robin Duke, Ellen L. Fogle, Nate Herman, Tim Kazurinsky, Andy Kurtzman, Eddie Murphy, Pamela Norris, Margaret Oberman, Joe Piscopo, David Sheffield, Andrew Smith, Bob Tischler, Tracy Tormé and Eliot Wald. The head writers were Bob Tischler and Andrew Smith.

Episodes

References 

08
1982 American television seasons
1983 American television seasons
Saturday Night Live in the 1980s